Aida Steshenko (born August 11, 1968) is a table tennis player from Turkmenistan who participated in the 1996 and 2000 Summer Olympics and five World Table Tennis Championships.

Early life
Steshenko was born on 11 August 1968 and received her degree from an Armenian university.

Career
Steshenko competed in both the women's singles and doubles events during the 1993, 1995 and 1997 World Table Tennis Championships. She represented Turkmenistan at the 1996 Summer Olympics in table tennis women's singles category. However, she lost all three of her matches and could not advance beyond the group stage. At the next Olympics too she lost all of her matches and was eliminated in the groups. She also participated in the World Championships held in 1999 (individual) and 2000 (team).

References

External links
 
 

1968 births
Living people
Table tennis players at the 1996 Summer Olympics
Table tennis players at the 2000 Summer Olympics
Olympic table tennis players of Turkmenistan
Turkmenistan female table tennis players